Ochotonidae is a family of small mammals in the order Lagomorpha. A member of this family is called an ochotonid or, colloquially, a pika. They are widespread throughout Asia and western North America, and are generally found in grassland, shrubland, and rocky biomes. Pikas are all roughly the same shape and size, with no tails, ranging from the 11 cm (4 in) long Gansu pika to the 29 cm (11 in) long northern pika. No species have population estimates and many have not yet had their conservation status evaluated, though the Helan Shan pika, Hoffmann's pika, Ili pika, and Koslov's pika are considered endangered.

The 29 extant species of Ochotonidae are contained within a single genus, Ochotona, though that genus is sometimes split into four subgenera: Alienauroa, Conothoa (mountain pikas), Ochotona (shrub-steppe pikas), and Pika (northern pikas). Many extinct Ochotonidae species have been discovered, though due to ongoing research and discoveries the exact number and categorization is not fixed.

Conventions

Conservation status codes listed follow the International Union for Conservation of Nature (IUCN) Red List of Threatened Species. Range maps are provided wherever possible; if a range map is not available, a description of the ochotonid's range is provided. Ranges are based on the IUCN Red List for that species unless otherwise noted. All extinct species or subspecies listed alongside extant species went extinct after 1500 CE, and are indicated by a dagger symbol "".

Classification
The family Ochotonidae consists of twenty-nine extant species in one genus which are divided into dozens of extant subspecies. This does not include hybrid species or extinct prehistoric species.

Ochotonids
The following classification is based on the taxonomy described by Mammal Species of the World (2005), with augmentation by generally accepted proposals made since using molecular phylogenetic analysis, as supported by both the IUCN and the American Society of Mammalogists.

References

Sources

 
 

 
ochotonidae
ochotonidae